The Apostolic Christian School is a Canadian private Christian school located in Plaster Rock, New Brunswick.

The school was founded in 1976 by Pastor Jim McKillop and is administered by the Family Worship Centre (formerly known as the First Apostolic Pentecostal Church) of Plaster Rock.

References

Private schools in New Brunswick
Christian schools in Canada